Films released by the Pathé Industries subsidiaries Eagle-Lion Films (producer and distributor) and Eagle-Lion Classics (solely distributor) between 1947 and 1951. The companies' releases were a mixture of imports from Britain, mainly from the J. Arthur Rank Organization (originator of the Eagle-Lion brand), and American productions both in-house and from independent producers. Some of Eagle-Lion's earliest releases were produced by another Pathé subsidiary, Producers Releasing Corporation, and are included in the List of PRC films. PRC was absorbed into Eagle-Lion between late 1947 and early 1948. In 1950, in-house production ceased and Eagle-Lion Films was merged with independent reissues distributor Film Classics to create Eagle-Lion Classics. The following year, Eagle-Lion Classics was acquired by and merged into United Artists.

Films

References 

Eagle-Lion Films films
Eagle-Lion
Eagle-Lion